

Events

Pre-1600
29 BC – Octavian holds the first of three consecutive triumphs in Rome to celebrate the victory over the Dalmatian tribes.
 523 – John I becomes the new Pope after the death of Pope Hormisdas.
 554 – Emperor Justinian I rewards Liberius for his service in the Pragmatic Sanction, granting him extensive estates in Italy.
 582 – Maurice becomes Emperor of the Byzantine Empire.
 900 – Count Reginar I of Hainault rises against Zwentibold of Lotharingia and slays him near present-day Susteren.
1099 – Raniero is elected as Pope Paschal II, who would become deeply entangled in the Investiture Controversy.
1516 – The Treaty of Noyon between France and Spain is signed. Francis I of France recognizes Charles's claim to Naples, and Charles V, Holy Roman Emperor, recognizes Francis's claim to Milan.
1521 – After an extended siege, forces led by Spanish conquistador Hernán Cortés capture Tlatoani Cuauhtémoc and conquer the Aztec capital of Tenochtitlan.
1532 – Union of Brittany and France: The Duchy of Brittany is absorbed into the Kingdom of France.
1536 – Buddhist monks from Kyoto, Japan's Enryaku-ji temple set fire to 21 Nichiren temples throughout Kyoto in what will be known as the Tenbun Hokke Disturbance. (Traditional Japanese date: Twenty-seventh day of the seventh month of the fifth year of the Tenbun (天文) era).
1553 – Michael Servetus is arrested by John Calvin in Geneva, Switzerland as a heretic.

1601–1900
1624 – The French king Louis XIII appoints Cardinal Richelieu as prime minister.
1645 – Sweden and Denmark sign Peace of Brömsebro.
1650 – Colonel George Monck of the English Army forms Monck's Regiment of Foot, which will later become the Coldstream Guards.
1704 – War of the Spanish Succession: Battle of Blenheim: English and Imperial forces are victorious over French and Bavarian troops.
1779 – American Revolutionary War: The Royal Navy defeats the Penobscot Expedition with the most significant loss of United States naval forces prior to the attack on Pearl Harbor.
1792 – King Louis XVI of France is formally arrested by the National Tribunal, and declared an enemy of the people.
1806 – Battle of Mišar during the Serbian Revolution begins. The battle ends two days later with a Serbian victory over the Ottomans.
1814 – The Convention of London, a treaty between the United Kingdom and the United Netherlands, is signed in London, England.
1868 – The 8.5–9.0  Arica earthquake struck southern Peru with a maximum Mercalli intensity of XI (Extreme), causing 25,000+ deaths and a destructive basin wide tsunami that affected Hawaii and New Zealand.
1889 – William Gray of Hartford, Connecticut is granted United States Patent Number 408,709 for "Coin-controlled apparatus for telephones."
1898 – Spanish–American War: Spanish and American forces engage in a mock battle for Manila, after which the Spanish commander surrendered in order to keep the city out of Filipino rebel hands.
  1898   – Carl Gustav Witt discovers 433 Eros, the first near-Earth asteroid to be found.
1900 – The steamer Deutschland of Hamburg America Lines set a new record for the eastward passage when it docked on Plymouth, England, five days, 11 hours and 45 minutes after sailing from New York, breaking by three hours, six minutes its previous mark in its maiden voyage in July.

1901–present
1905 – Norwegians vote to end the union with Sweden.
1906 – The all black infantrymen of the U.S. Army's 25th Infantry Regiment are accused of killing a white bartender and wounding a white police officer in Brownsville, Texas, despite exculpatory evidence; all are later dishonorably discharged. (Their records were later restored to reflect honorable discharges but there were no financial settlements.)
1913 – First production in the UK of stainless steel by Harry Brearley.
1918 – Women enlist in the United States Marine Corps for the first time. Opha May Johnson is the first woman to enlist.
  1918   – Bayerische Motoren Werke AG (BMW) established as a public company in Germany.
1920 – Polish–Soviet War: The Battle of Warsaw begins and will last till August 25. The Red Army is defeated.
1937 – Second Sino-Japanese War: The Battle of Shanghai begins.
1942 – Major General Eugene Reybold of the U.S. Army Corps of Engineers authorizes the construction of facilities that would house the "Development of Substitute Materials" project, better known as the Manhattan Project.
1944 – World War II: German troops begin the pillage and razing of Anogeia in Crete that would continue until September 5.
1954 – Radio Pakistan broadcasts the "Qaumī Tarāna", the national anthem of Pakistan for the first time.
1960 – The Central African Republic declares independence from France.
1961 – Cold War: East Germany closes the border between the eastern and western sectors of Berlin to thwart its inhabitants' attempts to escape to the West, and construction of the Berlin Wall is started. The day is known as Barbed Wire Sunday. 
1964 – Peter Allen and Gwynne Evans are hanged for the murder of John Alan West becoming the last people executed in the United Kingdom.
1967 – Two young women became the first fatal victims of grizzly bear attacks in the 57-year history of Montana's Glacier National Park in separate incidents.
1968 – Alexandros Panagoulis attempts to assassinate the Greek dictator Colonel Georgios Papadopoulos in Varkiza, Athens.
1969 – The Apollo 11 astronauts enjoy a ticker tape parade in New York City. That evening, at a state dinner in Los Angeles, they are awarded the Presidential Medal of Freedom by U.S. President Richard Nixon.
1973 – Aviaco Flight 118 crashes on approach to A Coruña Airport in A Coruña, Spain, killing 85.
1977 – Members of the British National Front (NF) clash with anti-NF demonstrators in Lewisham, London, resulting in 214 arrests and at least 111 injuries.
1978 – One hundred fifty Palestinians in Beirut are killed in a terrorist attack during the second phase of the Lebanese Civil War.
1990 – A mainland Chinese fishing boat Min Ping Yu No. 5202 is hit by a Taiwanese naval vessel and sinks in a repatriation operation of mainland Chinese immigrants, resulting in 21 deaths. This is the second tragedy less than a month after Min Ping Yu No. 5540 incident.
2004 – One hundred fifty-six Congolese Tutsi refugees are massacred at the Gatumba refugee camp in Burundi.
2008 – Russo-Georgian War: Russian units occupy the Georgian city of Gori.
2015 – At least 76 people are killed and 212 others are wounded in a truck bombing in Baghdad, Iraq.
2020 – Israel–United Arab Emirates relations are formally established.

Births

Pre-1600
 985 – Al-Hakim bi-Amr Allah, Fatimid caliph (d. 1021)
1311 – Alfonso XI, king of Castile and León (d. 1350)
1584 – Theophilus Howard, 2nd Earl of Suffolk, English admiral and politician, Lord Lieutenant of Cumberland (d. 1640)
1592 – William, Count of Nassau-Siegen, German count, field marshal of the Dutch State Army (d. 1642)

1601–1900
1625 – Rasmus Bartholin, Danish physician, mathematician, and physicist (d. 1698)
1662 – Charles Seymour, 6th Duke of Somerset, English politician, Lord President of the Council (d. 1748)
1666 – William Wotton, English linguist and scholar (d. 1727)
1700 – Heinrich von Brühl, Polish-German politician (d. 1763)
1717 – Louis François, Prince of Conti (d. 1776)
1756 – James Gillray, English caricaturist and printmaker (d.1815)
1764 – Louis Baraguey d'Hilliers, French general (d. 1813)
1790 – William Wentworth, Australian journalist, explorer, and politician (d. 1872)
1803 – Vladimir Odoyevsky, Russian philosopher and critic (d. 1869)
1814 – Anders Jonas Ångström, Swedish physicist and astronomer (d. 1874)
1818 – Lucy Stone, American abolitionist and suffragist (d. 1893)
1819 – Sir George Stokes, 1st Baronet, Anglo-Irish mathematician and physicist (d. 1903)
1820 – George Grove, English musicologist and historian (d. 1900)
1823 – Goldwin Smith, English-Canadian historian and journalist (d. 1910)
1831 – Salomon Jadassohn, German pianist and composer (d. 1902)
1841 – Johnny Mullagh, Australian cricketer (d. 1891)
1842 – Charles Wells, English brewer, founded Charles Wells Ltd (d. 1914)
1849 – Leonora Barry, Irish-born American social activist (d. 1930)
1851 – Felix Adler, German-American religious leader and educator (d. 1933)
1860 – Annie Oakley, American target shooter (d. 1926)
1866 – Giovanni Agnelli, Italian businessman, founded Fiat S.p.A. (d. 1945)
1867 – George Luks, American painter and illustrator (d. 1933)
1872 – Richard Willstätter, German-Swiss chemist and academic, Nobel Prize Laureate (d. 1942)
1879 – John Ireland, English composer and educator (d. 1962)
1884 – Harry Dean, English cricketer and coach (d. 1957)
1888 – John Logie Baird, Scottish engineer, invented the television (d. 1946)
  1888   – Gleb W. Derujinsky, Russian-American sculptor (d. 1975)
1889 – Camillien Houde, Canadian lawyer and politician, 34th Mayor of Montreal (d. 1958)
1895 – István Barta, Hungarian water polo player (d. 1948)
  1895   – Bert Lahr, American actor (d. 1967)
1898 – Jean Borotra, French tennis player (d. 1994)
  1898   – Regis Toomey, American actor (d. 1991)
1899 – Alfred Hitchcock, English-American director and producer (d. 1980)
  1899   – José Ramón Guizado, Panamanian politician, 17th President of Panama (d. 1964)

1901–present
1902 – Felix Wankel, German engineer (d. 1988)
1904 – Buddy Rogers, American actor and musician (d. 1999)
  1904   – Margaret Tafoya, Native American Pueblo potter (d. 2001)
1906 – Chuck Carroll, American football player and lawyer (d. 2003)
  1906   – Art Shires, American baseball player and boxer (d. 1967)
1907 – Basil Spence, Scottish architect, designed Coventry Cathedral (d. 1976)
1908 – Gene Raymond, American actor and pilot (d. 1998)
1911 – William Bernbach, American advertiser, co-founded DDB Worldwide (d. 1982)
1912 – Claire Cribbs, American basketball player and coach (d. 1985)
  1912   – Ben Hogan, American golfer and sportscaster (d. 1997)
  1912   – Salvador Luria, Italian-American microbiologist and academic, Nobel Prize laureate (d. 1991)
1913 – Makarios III, Greek archbishop and politician, 1st President of Cyprus (d. 1977)
  1913   – Fred Davis, English snooker player (d. 1998)
1914 – Grace Bates, American mathematician and academic (d. 1996)
1917 – Sid Gordon, American baseball player (d. 1975)
1918 – Noor Hassanali, Trinidadian lawyer and politician, 2nd President of Trinidad and Tobago (d. 2006)
  1918   – Frederick Sanger, English biochemist and academic, Nobel Prize laureate (d. 2013)
1919 – Rex Humbard, American evangelist and television host (d. 2007)
  1919   – George Shearing, English jazz pianist and bandleader (d. 2011)
1920 – Neville Brand, American actor (d. 1992)
1921 – Louis Frémaux, French conductor (d. 2017)
  1921   – Jimmy McCracklin, American blues/R&B singer-songwriter and pianist (d. 2012)
  1921   – Mary Lee, Scottish singer (d. 2022)
1922 – Chuck Gilmur, American basketball player, coach, and educator (d. 2011)
1925 – Benny Bailey, American trumpet player, songwriter, and producer (d. 2005)
  1925   – José Alfredo Martínez de Hoz, Argentine executive and policy maker (d. 2013)
1926 – Fidel Castro, Cuban lawyer and politician, 15th President of Cuba (d. 2016)
1928 – John Tidmarsh,  English journalist and radio host (d. 2019)
1929 – Pat Harrington, Jr., American actor (d. 2016)
1930 – Wilfried Hilker, German footballer and referee
  1930   – Don Ho, American singer and ukulele player (d. 2007)
  1930   – Bernard Manning, English comedian (d. 2007)
  1930   – Wilmer Mizell, American baseball player and politician (d. 1999)
  1930   – Bob Wiesler, American baseball player (d. 2014)
1933 – Joycelyn Elders, American admiral and physician, 15th Surgeon General of the United States
1935 – Alex de Renzy, American director and producer (d. 2001)
  1935   – Mudcat Grant, American baseball player and sportscaster (d. 2021)
1938 – Dave "Baby" Cortez, American R&B pianist, organist, and composer
  1938   – Bill Masterton, Canadian ice hockey player (d. 1968)
1940 – Bill Musselman, American basketball player and coach (d. 2000)
1943 – Fred Hill, American football player
  1943   – Ertha Pascal-Trouillot, President of Haiti 
  1943   – Michael Willetts, English sergeant; George Cross recipient (d. 1971)
1945 – Lars Engqvist, Swedish politician, Deputy Prime Minister of Sweden
  1945   – Gary Gregor, American basketball player
  1945   – Robin Jackman, Indian-English cricketer and sportscaster (d. 2020)
  1945   – Howard Marks, Welsh cannabis smuggler, writer, and legalisation campaigner (d. 2016)
1947 – Fred Stanley, American baseball player and manager
  1947   – John Stocker, Canadian voice actor and director
  1947   – Margareta Winberg, Swedish politician, Deputy Prime Minister of Sweden
1948 – Kathleen Battle, American operatic soprano 
1949 – Jim Brunzell, American wrestler
  1949   – Bobby Clarke, Canadian ice hockey player and manager
  1949   – Philippe Petit, French tightrope walker
  1949   – Willy Rey, Dutch-Canadian model (d. 1973)
1950 – Jane Carr, English actress
  1950   – Rusty Gerhardt, American baseball player, coach, and manager
1951 – Dan Fogelberg, American singer-songwriter and guitarist (d. 2007)
1952 – Dave Carter, American singer-songwriter and guitarist (d. 2002)
  1952   – Gary Gibbs, American football player and coach
  1952   – Suzanne Muldowney, American performance artist
  1952   – Herb Ritts, American photographer and director (d. 2002)
  1952   – Hughie Thomasson, American singer-songwriter and guitarist (d. 2007)
  1952   – Eugenio Lopez III, Filipino businessperson, CEO and chairman of ABS-CBN Corporation
1953 – Tom Cohen, American philosopher, theorist, and academic
  1953   – Ron Hilditch, Australian rugby league player and coach
  1953   – Thomas Pogge, German philosopher and academic
  1953   – Peter Wright, English historian and author
1954 – Nico Assumpção, Brazilian bass player (d. 2001)
1955 – Keith Ahlers, English race car driver
  1955   – Hideo Fukuyama, Japanese race car driver
  1955   – Paul Greengrass, English director and screenwriter
1956 – Rohinton Fali Nariman, Judge of the Supreme Court of India
1958 – David Feherty, Northern Irish golfer and sportscaster
  1958   – Feargal Sharkey, Northern Irish singer-songwriter 
  1958   – Randy Shughart, American sergeant, Medal of Honor recipient (d. 1993)
1959 – Danny Bonaduce, American actor and wrestler
  1959   – Bruce French, English cricketer and coach
  1959   – Tom Niedenfuer, American baseball player
1960 – Ivar Stukolkin, Estonian swimmer
1961 – Koji Kondo, Japanese composer and sound director
  1961   – Neil Mallender, English cricketer and umpire
  1961   – Tom Perrotta, American novelist and screenwriter 
1962 – John Slattery, American actor, director, producer, and screenwriter
1963 – Steve Higgins, American talk show co-host and announcer, writer, producer, comedian and impressionist
  1963   – Valerie Plame, American CIA agent and author
  1963   – Sridevi, Indian actress (d. 2018)
1964 – Jay Buhner, American baseball player and sportscaster
  1964   – Debi Mazar, American actress
  1964   – Tom Prince, American baseball player and manager
1965 – Mark Lemke, American baseball player, coach, and radio host
  1965   – Hayato Matsuo, Japanese composer and conductor
1966 – Scooter Barry, American basketball player
  1966   – Shayne Corson, Canadian ice hockey player
1967 – Dave Jamerson, American basketball player
  1967   – Digna Ketelaar, Dutch tennis player
1968 – Tal Bachman, Canadian singer-songwriter
  1968   – Todd Hendricks, American football player and coach
  1968   – Tony Jarrett, English sprinter and hurdler
1969 – Midori Ito, Japanese figure skater
1970 – Will Clarke, American author
  1970   – Elvis Grbac, American football player and coach
  1970   – Alan Shearer, English footballer and manager
1971 – Patrick Carpentier, Canadian race car driver
  1971   – Adam Housley, American baseball player and journalist
1972 – Kevin Plank, American businessman, founded Under Armour
1973 – Molly Henneberg, American journalist
  1973   – Eric Medlen, American race car driver (d. 2007)
1974 – Scott MacRae, American baseball player and coach
  1974   – Joe Perry, English snooker player
  1974   – Niklas Sundin, Swedish musician and artist
  1974   – Jarrod Washburn, American baseball player and coach
1975 – Shoaib Akhtar, Pakistani cricketer
  1975   – Marty Turco, Canadian ice hockey player and sportscaster
1976 – Geno Carlisle, American basketball player
  1976   – Nicolás Lapentti, Ecuadorian tennis player 
1977 – Michael Klim, Polish-Australian swimmer
  1977   – Kenyan Weaks, American basketball player and coach
1978 – Dwight Smith, American football player
1979 – Román Colón, Dominican baseball player
  1979   – Corey Patterson, American baseball player
  1979   – Taizō Sugimura, Japanese politician
1980 – Murtz Jaffer, Canadian journalist
1982 – Christopher Raeburn, English fashion designer
  1982   – Sarah Huckabee Sanders, American political consultant and press secretary
  1982   – Sebastian Stan, Romanian-American actor
1983 – Dallas Braden, American baseball player
  1983   – Aleš Hemský, Czech ice hockey player
  1983   – Ľubomír Michalík, Slovak footballer
  1983   – Christian Müller, German footballer
1984 – Alona Bondarenko, Ukrainian tennis player
  1984   – Niko Kranjčar, Croatian footballer
  1984   – Boone Logan, American baseball player
  1984   – James Morrison, English singer-songwriter and guitarist
1985 – Gerrit van Look, German rugby player and coach
1987 – Jose Lorenzo Diokno, Filipino director, producer, and screenwriter
  1987   – Devin McCourty, American football player
  1987   – Jason McCourty, American football player
  1987   – Jamie Reed, Welsh footballer
1988 – Keith Benson, American basketball player
  1988   – Brandon Workman, American baseball player
1989 – Greg Draper, New Zealand footballer
  1989   – Justin Greene, American basketball player
  1989   – Israel Jiménez, Mexican footballer
1990 – DeMarcus Cousins, American basketball player
  1990   – Benjamin Stambouli, French footballer
1991 – Dave Days, American singer-songwriter and guitarist
  1991   – Lesley Doig, Scottish lawn bowler
1992 – Lucas Moura, Brazilian footballer
  1992   – Katrina Gorry, Australian football player
  1992   – Alicja Tchórz, Polish swimmer
1993 – Moses Mbye, Australian rugby league player
1994 – Filip Forsberg, Swedish ice hockey player
1996 – Antonia Lottner, German tennis player
1998 – Dalma Gálfi, Hungarian tennis player
2000 – Na Jaemin, South Korean rapper, singer, dancer and actor

Deaths

Pre-1600
 587 – Radegund, Frankish princess and saint (b. 520)
 604 – Wen, emperor of the Sui Dynasty (b. 541)
 612 – Fabia Eudokia, Byzantine empress (b. 580)
 662 – Maximus the Confessor, Byzantine theologian
 696 – Takechi, Japanese prince
 900 – Zwentibold, king of Lotharingia (b. 870)
 908 – Al-Muktafi, Abbasid caliph
 981 – Gyeongjong, king of Goryeo (Korea) (b. 955)
1134 – Irene of Hungary, Byzantine empress (b. 1088)
1297 – Nawrūz, Mongol emir 
1311 – Pietro Gradenigo, doge of Venice
1382 – Eleanor of Aragon, queen of Castile (b. 1358)
1447 – Filippo Maria Visconti, duke of Milan (b. 1392)
1523 – Gerard David, Flemish painter (b. 1460)

1601–1900
1608 – Giambologna, Italian sculptor (b. 1529)
1617 – Johann Jakob Grynaeus, Swiss clergyman and theologian (b. 1540)
1667 – Jeremy Taylor, Irish bishop and saint (b. 1613)
1686 – Louis Maimbourg, French priest and historian (b. 1610)
1721 – Jacques Lelong, French priest and author (b. 1665)
1744 – John Cruger, Danish-American businessman and politician, 39th Mayor of New York City (b. 1678)
1749 – Johann Elias Schlegel, German poet and critic (b. 1719)
1766 – Margaret Fownes-Luttrell, English painter (b. 1726)
1795 – Ahilyabai Holkar, Queen of Indore (b. 1725)
1826 – René Laennec, French physician, invented the stethoscope (b. 1781)
1863 – Eugène Delacroix, French painter and lithographer (b. 1798)
1865 – Ignaz Semmelweis, Hungarian physician and obstetrician (b. 1818)

1901–present
1910 – Florence Nightingale, Italian-English nurse and theologian (b. 1820)
1912 – Jules Massenet, French composer (b. 1842)
1917 – Eduard Buchner, German chemist, Nobel Prize laureate (b. 1860)
1934 – Mary Hunter Austin, American author and playwright (b. 1868) 
1937 – Sigizmund Levanevsky, Soviet aircraft pilot of Polish origin (b. 1902)
1946 – H. G. Wells, English novelist, historian, and critic (b. 1866)
1954 – Demetrius Constantine Dounis, Greek violinist and mandolin player (b. 1886)
1958 – Francis J. McCormick, American football, basketball player, and coach (b. 1903)
1963 – Louis Bastien, French cyclist and fencer (b. 1881)
1965 – Hayato Ikeda, Japanese lawyer and politician, 58th Prime Minister of Japan (b. 1899)
1971 – W. O. Bentley, English race car driver and engineer, founded Bentley Motors Limited (b. 1888)
1975 – Murilo Mendes, Brazilian poet and telegrapher (b. 1901)
1978 – Lonnie Mayne, American wrestler (b. 1944)
1979 – Andrew Dasburg, American painter and sculptor (b. 1887)
1984 – Tigran Petrosian, Georgian-Armenian chess player (b. 1929)
1986 – Helen Mack, American actress (b. 1913)
1989 – Tim Richmond, American race car driver (b. 1955)
  1989   – Larkin I. Smith, American police officer and politician (b. 1944)
1991 – James Roosevelt, American general and politician (b. 1907)
1995 – Alison Hargreaves, English mountaineer (b. 1963)
  1995   – Jan Křesadlo, Czech-English psychologist and author (b. 1926)
  1995   – Mickey Mantle, American baseball player and sportscaster (b. 1931)
1996 – António de Spínola, Portuguese general and politician, 14th President of Portugal (b. 1910)
1998 – Nino Ferrer, Italian-French singer-songwriter and guitarist (b. 1934)
  1998   – Edward Ginzton, Ukrainian-American physicist and academic (b. 1915)
  1998   – Julien Green, American author (b. 1900)
  1998   – Rafael Robles, Dominican-American baseball player (b. 1947)
1999 – Ignatz Bubis, German Jewish religious leader (b. 1927)
  1999   – Jaime Garzón, Colombian journalist and lawyer (b. 1960)
2000 – Nazia Hassan, Pakistani singer-songwriter (b. 1965)
2001 – Otto Stuppacher, Austrian race car driver (b. 1947)
  2001   – Jim Hughes, American baseball player and manager (b. 1923)
  2001   – Betty Cavanna, American author (b. 1909)
2003 – Ed Townsend, American singer-songwriter and producer (b. 1929)
2004 – Julia Child, American chef, author, and television host (b. 1912)
2005 – Miguel Arraes, Brazilian lawyer and politician (b. 1916)
  2005   – David Lange, New Zealand lawyer and politician, 32nd Prime Minister of New Zealand (b. 1942)
2006 – Tony Jay, English actor and singer (b. 1933)
  2006   – Jon Nödtveidt, Swedish musician (b. 1975)
2007 – Brian Adams, American wrestler (b. 1964)
  2007   – Brooke Astor, American philanthropist and socialite (b. 1902)
  2007   – Phil Rizzuto, American baseball player and sportscaster (b. 1917)
2008 – Henri Cartan, French mathematician and academic (b. 1904)
  2008   – Bill Gwatney, American politician (b. 1959)
  2008   – Jack Weil, American businessman (b. 1901)
2009 – Lavelle Felton, American basketball player (b. 1980)
2010 – Panagiotis Bachramis, Greek footballer (b. 1976)
  2010   – Lance Cade, American wrestler (b. 1981)
  2010   – Edwin Newman, American journalist and author (b. 1919)
2011 – Tareque Masud, Bangladeshi director, producer, and screenwriter (b. 1957)
  2011   – Mishuk Munier, Bangladeshi journalist and cinematographer (b. 1959)
2012 – Hugo Adam Bedau, American philosopher and academic (b. 1926)
  2012   – Helen Gurley Brown, American journalist and author (b. 1922)
  2012   – Ray Jordon, Australian cricketer and coach (b. 1937)
  2012   – Johnny Pesky, American baseball player and manager (b. 1919)
  2012   – Joan Roberts, American actress and singer (b. 1917)
2013 – Lothar Bisky, German politician (b. 1941)
  2013   – Aaron Selber, Jr., American businessman and philanthropist (b. 1927)
  2013   – Jean Vincent, French footballer and manager (b. 1930)
2014 – Frans Brüggen, Dutch flute player and conductor (b. 1934)
  2014   – Eduardo Campos, Brazilian politician, 14th Brazilian Minister of Science and Technology (b. 1965)
  2014   – Martino Finotto, Italian race car driver (b. 1933)
  2014   – Süleyman Seba, Turkish footballer and manager (b. 1926)
2015 – Watban Ibrahim al-Tikriti, Iraqi politician, Iraqi Minister of Interior (b. 1952)
  2015   – Bob Fillion, Canadian ice hockey player and manager (b. 1920)
  2015   – Om Prakash Munjal, Indian businessman and philanthropist, co-founded Hero Cycles (b. 1928)
2016 – Kenny Baker, English actor and musician (b. 1934) 
  2016   – Pramukh Swami Maharaj, Indian Hindu leader (b. 1921)
2018 – Jim Neidhart, American wrestler (b. 1955)
2021 – Nanci Griffith, American singer-songwriter (b. 1953)

Holidays and observances
Christian feast day:
Benedetto Sinigardi
Benildus Romançon
Centola and Helen
Cassian of Imola
Clara Maass (Lutheran Church)
Fachtna of Rosscarbery
Florence Nightingale, Octavia Hill  (Lutheran Church)
Herulph
Hippolytus of Rome
Jeremy Taylor (Anglican Communion)
John Berchmans
Junian of Mairé
Blessed Marco d'Aviano
Maximus the Confessor
Nerses Glaietsi (Catholic Church)
Pope Pontian
Radegunde
Wigbert
August 13 (Eastern Orthodox liturgics)
Independence Day, celebrates the independence of Central African Republic from France in 1960.
International Lefthanders Day (International)
Women's Day, commemorates the enaction of Tunisian Code of Personal Status in 1956. (Tunisia)
World Organ Donation Day

References

External links

 
 
 

Days of the year
August